The United Workers Association is a human rights organization led by low-wage workers in Maryland in the United States.  The organization was founded in 2002 by a group of homeless men and women in Baltimore. In 2004 the United Workers Association launched a campaign to secure living wages at the Oriole Park at Camden Yards, targeting Baltimore Orioles team owner Peter Angelos by demanding that he pay cleaners a living wage.

In 2007 the United Workers Association won its demand for living wages at Camden Yards.  On August 15, 2007, the organization announced that 11 workers and 4 allies would go on hunger strike starting September 3, 2007.  Governor Martin O'Malley responded by announcing his support of living wages at the stadium, and on September 3, 2007, the hunger strike was postponed, pending an upcoming meeting of the Maryland Stadium Authority.  On September 6, 2007, the Maryland Stadium Authority voted to pay cleaners the Maryland state living wage rate of $11.30 an hour, up from the current $7.00 an hour.  Later that day the United Workers Association announced that the hunger strike was called off in response to the victory.

External links 
 

Trade unions in the United States
Trade unions established in 2002